Grimoire is a sourcebook for the GURPS role-playing game system. It is a companion volume for the third edition GURPS Magic supplement. Its contents were merged into the 4th edition.

Contents
GURPS Grimoire has around four hundred new spells and introduces two new Colleges, Gate and Tech. It also doubles the number of elixirs available to the alchemist.

Publication history
GURPS Grimoire was written by Daniel U. Thibault and S. John Ross, and published by Steve Jackson Games.

Most of its contents are also included in the fourth edition of GURPS Magic, but for players sticking to the Third Edition it still is useful, especially for its updated flowcharts including spell prerequisites.

Reception
Rick Swan reviewed GURPS Grimoire for Dragon magazine #210 (October 1994). Swan comments: "This imaginative collection of spells for the GURPS game adds hundreds of options to the already lengthy list in the GURPS Magic supplement. Animal, Elemental, Gate, Necromantic, and Sound are among the nearly two dozen categories; sample effects include rain of stones, accelerate time, and cloud vaulting. A fascinating section of technological spells allows post-industrial mages to expel radioactive breath, create sentient computers, and speak with lawn mowers. Though everything's in GURPS-speak, a diligent referee should be able to convert it all to the system of his choice."

References

External links
http://www.sjgames.com/gurps/books/Grimoire/

Fantasy role-playing game supplements
Grimoire
Role-playing game supplements introduced in 1994